The root ar- is used in organic chemistry to form classification names for classes of organic compounds which contain a carbon skeleton and one or multiple aromatic rings. It was extracted from the word aromatic. See e.g. aryl.

Chemical nomenclature